Isabel Cueto was the defending champion but lost in the quarterfinals to Maria Strandlund.

Katerina Maleeva won in the final 6–1, 6–3 against Sabine Hack.

Seeds
A champion seed is indicated in bold text while text in italics indicates the round in which that seed was eliminated.

  Katerina Maleeva (champion)
  Barbara Paulus (first round)
  Isabel Cueto (quarterfinals)
  Sandra Cecchini (semifinals)
  Radka Zrubáková (quarterfinals)
  Sandra Wasserman (first round)
  Regina Rajchrtová (second round)
  Mercedes Paz (second round)

Draw

External links
 1989 Volvo Open draw

Women's Singles
Singles
Volvo Open,1989,Singles